Beatrice Rossato (born 6 November 1996) is an Italian professional racing cyclist, who currently rides for UCI Women's Continental Team .

See also
 List of 2015 UCI Women's Teams and riders

References

External links
 

1996 births
Living people
Italian female cyclists
Place of birth missing (living people)
People from Bassano del Grappa
Cyclists from the Province of Vicenza